Dai Lin (born 28 November 1987) is a Chinese footballer who currently plays as a centre-back for Shandong Taishan in the Chinese Super League.

Club career
Dai Lin started his football career with Liaoning FC in 2005 and made his debut against Changsha Ginde on 14 April 2005 in a 2–0 win. As a versatile player, Dai quickly established himself within the team throughout the 2005 league season and scored his first goal against Tianjin Teda on 16 July 2005 in a 1–0 win. He remained with the team for several further seasons when he helped Liaoning to several midtable positions until the 2008 season which saw Liaoning relegated after a disappointing season when they were relegated on the last day of the season. Despite this setback, Dai still attracted the interests from Bosnian Premier League side FK Slavija while his transfer listed price stood at £356,212. After deciding not to renew his contract with Liaoning, it was believed that he would train with FK Slavija for the start of the new season while the transfer went through. He went back to China to sign with top tier side Shanghai Shenhua halfway through the 2009 season after only two months with FK Slavija at a very surprising cut-price deal that saw him go for just £44,000.

Dai was quickly inserted into the team and would make his debut in a league game on 2 August 2009 against Jiangsu Sainty where he came on as a substitute for Aleksander Rodić in a 2–2 draw. After that game, he would quickly go on to become a regular member of the team and score his first goal for the club against Tianjin Teda in a league game on 20 September 2009 in a 4–0 victory; however, his poor disciplinary record saw him limited to only twelve games throughout the season. The following season Dai would show more maturity in defence and become a vital member within the team throughout the 2010 league season. This then saw the new manager Xi Zhikang name Dai as the club's new captain at the beginning of the 2011 league season. As the campaign went on, Shanghai would struggle within the league and Dai's performances would come into question after a 2–0 defeat to Shenzhen Ruby on 31 July 2011 when it was discovered that he was having relationship problems. This would eventually see him stripped of the captaincy when Jean Tigana arrived at the club at the beginning of the 2012 league season.

On 1 January 2014, Dai transferred to fellow Chinese Super League side Shandong Luneng (now known as Shandong Taishan). He made his debut for the club in a 1–0 win against Harbin Yiteng on 7 March 2014. He would go on to establish himself as an integral member within the team and was part of the squads that won the 2014 Chinese FA Cup and 2020 Chinese FA Cup, both against Jiangsu Suning F.C. He would go on to be used as a squad player within the team and would gain his first league title with the club when he was part of the team that won the 2021 Chinese Super League title. This would be followed up by him winning the 2022 Chinese FA Cup with them the next season.

International career
After gaining considerable playing time with Liaoning FC, Dai would soon be included into the Chinese under-23 national team and would take part in the 2007 Lunar New Year Cup and the 2007 Toulon Tournament where he twice saw his side lose in the final. He would eventually be called up to the Chinese national football team once he became an integral member of the Shanghai Shenhua's defence and go on to make his debut against Latvia on 11 November 2010 where he came on as a substitute in a 1–0 victory.

Career statistics
.

Honours

Club
Shandong Luneng/ Shandong Taishan
Chinese Super League: 2021
Chinese FA Cup: 2014, 2020, 2021, 2022.
Chinese FA Super Cup: 2015

References

External links
 
 
 Player stats at Sohu.com
 Official Shanghai Shenhua Website

1987 births
Living people
Chinese footballers
Footballers from Dalian
China international footballers
Chinese expatriate footballers
Footballers at the 2008 Summer Olympics
Olympic footballers of China
FK Slavija Sarajevo players
Expatriate footballers in Bosnia and Herzegovina
Liaoning F.C. players
Shanghai Shenhua F.C. players
Shandong Taishan F.C. players
Chinese Super League players
Association football defenders